Seiktein is a town in Mandalay Region in Central Myanmar. It lies just north of Mount Popa, on the Kyaukpadaung–Taungtha road. The town is in two parts, Seiktein North and Seiktein South along the road.

Notable citizens
Asaw, Queen of Uzana and mother of Narathihapate and Tayabya.

Notes

External links
"Seiktein Map — Satellite Images of Seiktein" Maplandia World Gazetteer

Populated places in Mandalay Region